This page provides summaries to the 2006 COSAFA Cup.

Format
In the first round, 12 teams were divided into 3 groups of 4 teams each. Each group played a knockout tournament. The winners of each group joined Zimbabwe (holders) into the final round.

First round

Group A 
Played in Maseru, Lesotho

Semi-finals

3rd/4th Places

Final

 Angola advance to final round

Group B
Played in Gaborone, Botswana

Semi-finals

3rd/4th Places

Final

 Botswana advance to final round

Group C
Played in Windhoek, Namibia

Semi-finals

3rd/4th Places

Final

 Zambia advance to final round

Final round
 Zimbabwe qualified as 2005 COSAFA Cup winner

Semi-finals

Final

Top scorers
4 goals
  Akwá

2 goals
  Mateus 
  Zé Kalanga
  Love
  Dube Phiri

External links
 2006 COSAFA Cup at RSSSF archives

Cosafa Cup, 2006
COSAFA Cup